Thanathorn Juangroongruangkit (born 25 November 1978) is a Thai politician who served as the leader of the Future Forward Party until the party dissolved in 2020. From 2002 to early-2018, Thanathorn was the vice president of the Thai Summit Group, Thailand's largest auto parts manufacturer.

Thanathorn co-founded the Future Forward Party in March 2018. He was unanimously elected as the party's leader during its first public meeting in May 2018.

Early life and family
Thanathorn was born and raised in Bangkok to a Thai Chinese family with ancestry from Fujian. His mother, Somporn Juangroongruangkit, is the current President and CEO of the Thai Summit Group, taking over the company from Thanathorn's father, Pattana Juangroongruangkit, after his death in 2002. Pattana founded the Thai Summit Group in 1977. The Juangroongruangkit family also owns a large stake in the Thai media conglomerate, Matichon Publishing Group.

Upon starting his political career, Thanathorn resigned from the Matichon board and Thai Summit Group. His mother, Somporn, also sold all her Matichon stock.

Thanathorn's uncle, Suriya Juangroongruangkit, is a politician who served as Minister of Transport of Thailand between 2002 and 2005. Suriya is one of the leaders of Palang Pracharat Party, the most prominent pro-junta party and the main party in the current government coalition.

Education 
Thanathorn attended the Triam Udom Suksa School in Bangkok. After graduating from high school, Thanathorn obtained a joint-honours Bachelor of Engineering (B.Eng.) in mechanical engineering from Thammasat University and the University of Nottingham. During this time, he became President of the Thammasat University Students Union in 1999, and was later named Deputy Secretary-General of the Students Federation of Thailand. He later pursued his interest in social and economic issues and obtained three master's degrees: one in political economy from Chulalongkorn University, one in a joint program in global finance from Stern School of Business, New York University and The Hong Kong University of Science and Technology, as well as one in international business law from the University of St. Gallen.

Throughout his studies, Thanathorn was involved with various charities and NGOs calling for social and economic reforms in Thailand, including Friends of the People and the Assembly of the Poor. During this time, Thanathorn campaigned for the land and compensation rights of villagers affected by the Pak Mun Dam in Ubon Ratchathani Province.

His family expressed concerns about Thanathorn's student movement activities. It is disclosed in several interviews that Thanathorn has been in conflict with his uncle, Suriya Juangroongruangkit, since he was young mainly due to their disagreement regarding the Trans Thai-Malaysia Gas Pipeline Project. Thanathorn believes the construction of this dam exemplified government's lack of accountability and crony capitalism that peaked with the 1997 economic crisis.

Business career 
After completing his studies, Thanathorn set out to pursue a career with the United Nations, and was offered a position as a development worker for the UN in Algeria. Thanathorn was forced to abandon his plans when his father, Pattana Juangroongruangkit, was diagnosed with cancer. Following his father's death in 2002, Thanathorn returned to Thailand and assumed leadership of the Thai Summit Group at the age of 23.

Under Thanathorn’s leadership, the company's revenues grew from 16 billion baht in 2001 to 80 billion baht in 2017. Thanathorn oversaw the transformation of the company into a global conglomerate with manufacturing facilities in seven countries and more than 16,000 employees worldwide.

In 2005, Thanathorn struck a deal with the US auto-maker, Tesla to supply 500,000 cars per year. The deal was noted as a "new record" for Thai Summit Group with total sales of 7.9 billion baht and a profit of 5.98 billion baht. Thanks to the deal, the Thai Summit Group set up factories in the United States. In 2009, Thanathorn led the company to acquire the world's largest mould maker, the Japanese company Ogihara.

Thanathorn served as the President of the Federation of Thai Industry's Nakhon Nayok Chapter for two consecutive terms, between 2008 and 2012. He was also the youngest elected Secretary-General of the Thai Auto Parts Manufacturers Association, serving between 2007 and 2010. Thanathorn was also a member of the Industrial Cluster Development Board of Thailand's National Science and Technology Development Agency.

In May 2018, after 17 years as Executive Vice-President of the Thai Summit Group, Thanathorn resigned from this position after being elected leader of the Future Forward Party.

Political career 

On 15 March 2018, Thanatorn and Piyabutr Saengkanokkul, a former constitutional law professor at Thammasat University, along with a group of like-minded individuals, filed for the creation of a new political party, Future Forward (Thai: อนาคตใหม่), with the Election Commission of Thailand. Thanathorn was unanimously elected as the party's leader at the party's first public meeting in May 2018.

Since founding the party, Thanathorn has advocated his vision for the party: the return of civilian government and demilitarization of Thai politics, greater political accountability, a fairer distribution of wealth, a social welfare system that promotes human dignity and greater decentralisation of power.

In order to guarantee Future Forward's independence and transparency, the party has developed a funding structure which relies entirely on donations from party members and supporters. The Future Forward Party goal is to raise 350 million baht from party members and the public to pursue its campaign in the 2019 general election.

Due to his business experience, relative youth, and political views, international media have drawn comparisons between Thanathorn and French President Emmanuel Macron and Canadian Prime Minister Justin Trudeau.

Thanathorn is occasionally referred by Thai media as the "billionaire commoner", representing the struggle to amend the social class system in Thailand. He is also jokingly referred to as "Daddy" by his young female supporters.

Thanathorn and two other senior party members, Jaruwan Sarankate and Klaikong Vaidhyakarn, were charged by police with the Computer Crime Act after an NCPO member filed an allegation against them for transmitting false information or information that damages the country's stability in relation with the Facebook Live Broadcast on 29 June 2018.

The three politicians were ordered to meet investigators at the Technology Crime Suppression Division (TCSD) on Friday, 24 August 2018 to hear charges against them. Through their lawyer, they asked to postpone the date to 17 September 2018, saying the order had come at a short notice and they were already tied up with their planned schedule. Thanathorn previously appeared on 31 July 2018 as a witness, but refrain from giving a statement on the allegations to officials.

Thanathorn was among the MPs elected in the 2019 vote. One month later, the Election Commission accused him of holding shares in a media company, V-Luck Media, when he registered as an MP candidate, which would violate election laws and disqualify him as an MP. Thanathorn has denied these charges, stating that all his shares had been transferred a month prior to his registration.  On 23 May 2019, one day before the opening of the new parliament, the Constitutional Court voted unanimously to accept the case submitted by the Election Commission against Thanathorn, and voted 8-1 to suspend Thanathorn's MP status until a ruling is reached. He was permitted to attend the opening ceremony to take his oath before being ordered to leave. Thanathorn was nominated for prime minister by a coalition of anti-junta parties, but lost to incumbent prime minister and coup leader Prayut Chan-o-cha. On 20 November, the Constitutional Court convicted Thanathorn, disqualifying his MP status.

In his mandatory disclosure of assets to the National Anti-Corruption Commission (NACC), Thanathorn reported assets of 5.6 billion baht, making him the wealthiest member of the Thai parliament.

Progressive Movement
Thanathorn founded the Progressive Movement with Piyabutr Saengkanokkul after their party dissolved. In January 2021, he was charged with lèse-majesté after criticizing Prayut Chan-o-cha government mismanagement of COVID-19 vaccination by relying too much on AstraZeneca vaccine which Siam Bioscience, owned by the King, supplies the most. On January 18, 2021, the Royal Thai Police charged him for defaming the government through a live stream on Facebook. Later, Puttipong Punnakanta filed the charge through Technology Crime Suppression Division and the court ordered taking the video down.

Later in August 2021, Thanathorn faced two more lèse-majesté charges for the same act.

Personal life 
The media often referred to him as "Ekk" or "Tee Ekk" (cognate with Uni in English; his nickname). He is married to Rawiphan Juangroongruangkit, they have four children together. Angered by the 2006 coup, Thanathorn gave his son the nickname, Demo (Thai: เดโม่), from the Greek root demos ('people').

In his free time, Thanathorn enjoys outdoor activities such as hiking, trekking, climbing, marathons, kayaking, cycling, diving and mountaineering. He has participated in various extreme sports competitions, including the Tor Des Géants and the Sahara Marathon. Thanathorn was the first Asian to complete the 560 km self-supported foot race above the Arctic Circle. Asked about his media diet, Thanathorn says he reads foreign newspapers like The New York Times, The Economist, Financial Times, and Thai newspapers like Matichon and Krungthep Turakij (Bangkok Business). He is a big fan of esports and games such as Minecraft and Arena of Valor, which he cites as one of the tools he uses to connect with his children.

In an interview about his style and grooming, Thanathorn revealed that he doesn't use any facial or hair products, moisturizers, or cosmetics. He also revealed that he wears generic white shirts and pleated khakis as a daily uniform. The only investment he makes into his wardrobe is for his climbing and running clothing for his outdoor hobbies.

External links 
 Facebook page
 Twitter feed
 Future forward Party

References 

1978 births
Thanathorn Juangroongruangkit
Thanathorn Juangroongruangkit
Thanathorn Juangroongruangkit
Thanathorn Juangroongruangkit
Living people
New York University alumni
Thanathorn Juangroongruangkit
Thanathorn Juangroongruangkit
Thanathorn Juangroongruangkit
Thanathorn Juangroongruangkit
Thanathorn Juangroongruangkit
Thanathorn Juangroongruangkit
Thanathorn Juangroongruangkit
Thanathorn Juangroongruangkit
Thanathorn Juangroongruangkit
Thanathorn Juangroongruangkit
Thanathorn Juangroongruangkit
University of St. Gallen alumni